This list of films featuring time loops where characters experience the same period of time which is repeatedly resetting: when a certain condition is met, such as a death of a character or a clock reaches a certain time, the loop starts again, with one or more characters retaining the memories from the previous loop. The list provides the names and brief synopses of films in which time loops are a prominent plot device.

For a list of films that include any kind of time travel (including time loops) see 
time travel in films.

See also

 List of time travel works of fiction
 Time travel in fiction

References

 
Time loops